Alexander Bissett was an Irish Anglican priest in the 18th century.

Bissett was born at Newport, Isle of Wight and educated at Christ Church, Oxford. He was the incumbent at Kilmore;Prebendary of Ballymore in Armagh Cathedral from 1757 to 1759; and Archdeacon of Connor from 1759 until his death.

His brother was Bishop of Raphoe from 1822 to 1834.

References

1782 deaths
18th-century Irish Anglican priests
Archdeacons of Connor
Alumni of Trinity College Dublin